Verkhoyansky District (Üöhee Caaŋı uluuha) is an administrative and municipal district (raion, or ulus), one of the thirty-four in the Sakha Republic, Russia. Its administrative center is the urban locality (a settlement) of Batagay. Population:  13,666 (2002 Census);  The population of Batagay accounts for 34.1% of the district's total population.

Geography 
The main river in the district is the Yana and its tributaries Nelgese, Derbeke, Tykakh and Baky.

Climate

History
The district was established on January 5, 1967.

Demographics
As of the 2010 Census, the ethnic composition was as follows:
Yakuts: 74.0%
Russians: 15.8%
Evens: 4.9%
Ukrainians: 1.6%
Evenks: 0.8%
other ethnicities: 2.9%

Economy
The economy of the district is mostly based on agriculture. There are deposits of tin, tungsten, copper, lead, antimony, gold, silver, brown coal, and other minerals.

Inhabited localities

Divisional source:

*Administrative centers are shown in bold

References

Notes

Sources

Districts of the Sakha Republic
States and territories established in 1967